Toucher and Rich is a Marconi Award-winning morning radio show from 6 to 10 AM on The Sports Hub 98.5 WBZ-FM, in Boston, Massachusetts. The show first aired on June 5, 2006. On August 13, 2009, following the demise of WBCN, the show moved to sports talk station WBZ-FM 98.5 The Sports Hub. Toucher & Rich celebrated their 10th anniversary on August 16, 2016, selling out the Wilbur Theatre for a special 10th Anniversary show, with numerous guests as well as the finals of 98 Mile year 4.

On September 24, 2016, Toucher & Rich received the Marconi Award, the highest award in radio for Major Market Personality of the Year.

From August 17, 2015, until July 13, 2018, the show was simulcast on NBC Sports Boston. The show is now streamed live on Twitch.

From June 5, 2006, until mid-2007 the show's opening theme was "Fuck All Y'all" by Saliva. Since 2007, the opening theme is "Honey Bucket" by Melvins.

Toucher and Rich entered regional syndication on October 25, 2021. The program's inaugural affiliates consisted of four Townsquare Media stations: the trimulcast of WCYY in Portland, Maine, WPKQ in North Conway, New Hampshire, and WJZN in Augusta, Maine; and WEZQ in Bangor, Maine.

In October 2022, longtime producer Mike Lockhart was unceremoniously fired as part of company-wide downsizing. This was despite The Sports Hub having the fifth highest billing of all radio stations in the country. On October 17, Shertenlieb announced on air that Lockhart would re-join the show, but his salary would be paid in full by Shertenlieb. Speaking of the decision, Shertenlieb said, “In return for the company allowing me to pay my own money to bring Mike back, I was made to sign a contract that the show would write four articles a day for the station’s website. But that was much better than some of the other things that they were asking for. This is the last I’ll speak of the last week, because quite frankly, I’m fried. But the bottom line is, we love Mike Lockhart, he’s a part of our team, and I always want him to be part of our team.”

Station Affiliates 
WBZ-FM Boston, Massachusetts (flagship)
WLZX (AM) East Longmeadow, Massachusetts
WLZX-FM Northampton, Massachusetts
WCYY Biddeford, Maine
WEZQ Bangor, Maine
WJZN Augusta, Maine
WPKQ North Conway, New Hampshire

Show Members
Fred "Toucher" Toettcher – Host
Rich Shertenlieb – Co-host, Production
Jon Wallach – Co-Host, Sports Hub Headlines. Wallach joined the show in 2009 following the transition to WBZ-FM. Prior to joining Toucher and Rich, Wallach worked at rival WEEI, providing headlines for Dale Arnold and Michael Holley. The latter once remarked to Fred that he and Rich "gave Wallach a personality" since joining their show.
Dan O'Brien – Executive Producer. Formerly the music director and night host on WBCN, Dan co-hosts the Tool Bags home improvement podcast with Tony Massarotti for WBZ-FM.
Mike Lockhart – Production Director/Producer. Co-host of the 98.5 The Sports Hub Fantasy Football Show on Sunday mornings during the NFL Season
Nick Gemelli – Producer – Nick interned for the show during WBCN, but abruptly left show in 2008 only to returning nearly eight years later. In May 2018, Nick fell ill and was diagnosed with methicillin-susceptible Staphylococcus aureus (MSSA) which almost killed him. He underwent open heart surgery to replace a damaged heart valve with artificial one. Fred frequently referring to Nick as "Young Sickly Nick." Nick currently runs the show's live Twitch stream and contributes to the Sports Hub website. He's also responsible for street audio segments for the show, including Drunken Recaps, ‘Ask A Pink Hat’ and more. He's the son of popular show personality, Mark Gemelli.

Former Show Members

Adolfo Gonzalez, Jr. – Former phone screener and street reporter who conducted interviews for the Drunken Red Sox, Bruins, Celtics, and Patriots recaps. Rich befriended Adolfo while working on the Kidd Kraddick morning show at KHKS, as Adolfo would frequently watch the show through the studio's street-facing windows. Adolfo is often remarked on for his weight, speech patterns, and depressingly neglectful childhood (bordering on criminally abusive child neglect). He is also noted for having knowledge of random facts associated with American History, in particular facts and dates related to World War II. Adolfo's last day was May 31, 2016, in order to return to college full-time in Texas.
Christopher "Crash" Clark – "Third mic" during the show's WBCN era, and the first year on WBZ-FM. Crash is close friends with Fred and Rich, having previously worked with them at 99X in Atlanta. During the WBCN years, Crash covered traffic, news, sports and more. Crash opted not to renew his contract in 2010, and returned to Atlanta. He now works at WXIA-TV as a traffic reporter. Crash has an affinity for Disney World, visiting the resort at least once per year with his wife.
Brian "B-Real" Flora – Producer during the show's WBCN era. Later worked on-air part-time at rival WAAF. B-Real regularly contributes feedback and content to the show to this day, and is mentioned on-air frequently by Fred and Rich.
Jonathan "Bird" Marchant – Former call screener. Known for working security at Fenway Park, "Bird" has an unrivaled inability to form coherent sentences while speaking. Bird continues to appear in occasional pre-recorded segments, typically reviewing films with Nick Gemelli.  Bird was let go from the station at the onset of COVID-19 in 2020, and was not rehired.
PJ – Former intern and later producer during the WBCN era. PJ exited the show in 2008.

104.1 WBCN

Contributors

The Chili Guy: A frequent bit on the show involved interviewing a schizophrenic homeless man known as "The Chili Guy". His rants and catch-phrases are a favorite on the show, including "Couple beers, no beers...chili", "Bring Him Up On Racketeering Charges!", "Who's Buyin'? Who's Sellin'? Who's Buyin'? Who's Sellin'?" and "How many eights you got?". His favorite food is from "Pizza House", and his favorite beverage is "Red Drink". He claims to be related to Ted DiBiase and Hulk Hogan. The Chili Guy was most often interviewed by Adolfo Gonzalez, though other members of the show and Fred's wife interviewed him at various times as well. The Chili Guy is believed to have died.
Dungeon Master Jim: a Boston lawyer whose main hobby is gaming. DMJ is the T&R definitive source for all things nerdy, and had his own segments.
The Gunner: An often inebriated caller who began every call by saying "Hey guys... hey." Pieces with The Gunner included his karaoke of various popular songs. Frequently challenged Adolfo to a "panty drinking contest", which involved chugging beers through a woman's used panties. To this day, many loyal listeners begin their calls into the showwith "hey guys, hey" in honor of The Gunner. The Gunner died on April 16, 2019. 
Mike "Behind The Mic" Callahan: A broadcaster from Dean College that sent in a demo tape in the hope that he could take Rich's job. Mike was tasked with making theme songs for all of the towns involved in the "Five Towns in Five Days" promotion that Toucher and Rich presented. MBTM continues to submit off-key song parodies.
Rich Cronin: This former member of boy band L.F.O. became a show favorite with his candid and self-effacing tales of a Boston guy in Hollywood, getting hit on by manager Lou Perlman, and scoring and being dumped by Jennifer Love Hewitt.
The T.A.R.D.S: The Toucher and Rich Show's fan base, standing for "Toucher And Rich Derelicts/Diehards/Disciples/Degenerates/Drunks".  In the early days of the show this term could be seen on bumper stickers all over Boston.  It's no longer used, presumably due to shifting social views regarding special needs and Rich's long-time involvement with the Miracle League of Massachusetts.

Popular segments
Best of Boston: An annual contest to determine who has the best face, butt, boobs and feet in Boston. Winners get tickets to the "chili pot" St. Patrick's Day.
Chili Guy Thursdays: Thursday installments of the show would dedicate significant time, if not the entire broadcast, to playing audio of Adolfo's latest encounters and escapades with The Chili Guy.
Warp Speed To the Weekend: A Friday segment where Dungeon Master Jim joined Fred and Rich to discuss the weekend's upcoming events in sci-fi and fantasy.
You Listened, Now Discuss: Inspired by Opie and Anthony's "What Did We Learn," this segment was typically reserved for the final break of the show during the WBCN run and early in the WBZ-FM era. Listeners would call in and reference things covered earlier in the show's broadcast. Comments would be followed by a clip of "Tom Sawyer" by Rush, mashed up with audio of The Harvard Square Hippie Puppeteer. "You Listened, Now Discuss" has since been replaced by "The Stack."

98.5 The Sports Hub

Past / Present Popular segments

What Happened Last Night?: Airing around 6:20am and setting the stage for the morning's broadcast, Rich features audio clips from the previous night's games, conferences, and interviews.
The Stack: Airs after 9:30am. This is the final segment of the broadcast, typically reserved for topics of discussion not already covered (usually non-sports oriented.)
"I'm an Ass Man": Billy Gunn's theme "Ass Man" plays at the conclusion of the show, usually as a signal for Fred and Rich to sign-off in preparation of the upcoming Zolak and Bertrand radio/television simulcast.
Fart Court: Fred, Rich, and Wallach take famous celebrities to court for passing gas. Notable celebrities found guilty include Nancy Grace, Wendy Williams, and the stations own Scott Zolak, who to this day, does not admit guilt. 
The Hot Take Police: Fred and Rich find and call out people in the media who have incredibly hot and outrageous takes on popular sports events/controversies (DeflateGate, etc.)
Drunken Celtics/Bruins/Red Sox recap: a member of the show goes out and interviews drunks outside of stadiums and bars after Celtics, Bruins and Red Sox games. The first meeting with the Chili Guy came during a drunken Red Sox recap.
Dating on Demand: The show analyzes cable company dating videos submitted by less than desirable folks while offering humorous commentary.
Ask a Pink Hat: The show finds a less-than-knowledgeable and/or drunk female fan wearing a pink Red Sox cap and asks her basic questions about the Red Sox or other local sports team.
Naughty Massarotti: Tony Massarotti reads Tweets and callers must decide whether they are real or he is making them up. Also used for describing "R-rated sex scenes" from select movies.
New Jack Edwards: NESN Boston Bruins commentator Jack Edwards reads aloud lyrics from new jack swing songs, and listeners guess the associated artist.
Dave Goucher Goes to the Movies: Dave Goucher (now with the Las Vegas Golden Knights) watches films such as The Karate Kid and Top Gun, and provides enthusiastic play-by-play.
What's In Your Stack: Adolfo goes to a local Comic Book Store or Convention on a Wednesday to talk to customers about what comics they are buying and to ask several basic questions. The show attempts to guess their answers.
 The T&R Draft: The show draft teams of people, TV shows, movies, etc. that fit into certain categories, such as "Hottest TV Moms," "Celebrities that need their own reality TV show," "Best Movie fight scene," and more. Draft order is determined by the flip of a "3-headed coin," usually resulting in Jon going last. The winner is determined by a poll of audience votes.
The Jon Gruden "This Guy" Challenge: Played on Tuesdays during the NFL season, Rich compiles the funniest and most ridiculous clips from ESPN NFL analyst Jon Gruden during his commentary of the previous night's Monday Night Football game, and a caller must decide whether or not Gruden will refer to players and/or coaches as "This Guy" during each clip.
98 Mile: Various on-air and off-air personalities at 98.5 The Sports Hub compete one on one in a ranked bracketed "rap battle" style tournament to determine who can rap and roast their assigned opponents in the most humorous and cleverest manner. The eventual winner of the contest was Damon Amendolara in year 1 and Jon Wallach in year 2. 98 Mile then went on a 3-year hiatus, returning in 2015 when Rich Keefe won the competition. Dan Roche won in year 4. The final round of year 4's competition was performed live at T&R's 10th Anniversary show, with Roche taking on Scott Zolak. Of note there were numerous references to Felger and Massarotti's producer James Stewart having an emotionless personality and fitting the stereotypical profile of a serial murderer. The name of the contest is a reference to the film 8-Mile.
Know Your Armpits of America: Rich gives a short description of a real news story, while Fred and Jon Wallach guess the town where the story occurred.
Best of/Worst of Brackets: In this bit, the cast creates March Madness-style brackets in order to pit pop culture figures against one another, usually in a field of 16. The most notorious of these bits was the "Worst Comedians" bracket (won by Dane Cook), which garnered international attention from various media outlets and comedy blogs.  Other examples include "Worst Sportscaster" (won by Glenn "The Big O" Ordway), "Most Fascinating Person in Boston" (won by The Harvard Square Puppeteer), "Douchiest Douchebag" (won by Spencer Pratt) featuring pick up artist extraordinaire Mystery, Brandon from Incubus, Guy Fieri, and others. "Best Internet Video" (won by The Alabama Leprechaun).
Faster Guy: An heir-apparent to the Chilli Guy, Mark aka "Faster Guy" is a well-meaning, mid-western-accented, pop-music loving hang-about that frequently runs into Adolfo outside the TD Garden and Fenway Park as the latter collects drunken recaps. The Faster Guy is known to favor non-sequiturs ("Ground beef is really a winner nowadays") and has various theories about the qualities that make up a good sports team ("left-handedness", for example, is a highly desirable athletic quality). The best attribute anything can have, of course, is the simple ability to go "faster", which in the Faster Guy's eyes cures many of life's ills. The crowning moment of a Faster Guy segment is usually when he finally references the word "faster", underscored by a dramatic rendition of "O Fortuna.
 Paul Finebaum Calls: Fred, Rich & Jon listen to the best and strangest calls into The Paul Finebaum Show, featuring regular callers like Mildred and Charles Allen Head, known best for introducing himself by saying, "Hey, Happy Tuesday/Wednesday."
 The Townie Test: Nick finds someone at a major event, whether it be a St. Patrick's Day parade or a Dropkick Murphys concert or some other event, and Fred and Wallach attempt to guess the contestant's answers to a series of questions. The intro song is sung over Shippin' up to Boston by the Dropkick Murphys
 Mark Gemelli: Intern Nick Gemelli's father, whom Nick lived with after recovering from open heart surgery. Mark Gemelli lives in a one-bedroom apartment in the North End, overlooking the parking garage at Government Center. Mark enjoys cooking meatballs, drinking Manhattans at 3pm, and thinks his son has "dick tendencies." He has an affinity for recliners, preferring to sleep in one over his bed. Shortly before Christmas in 2018, Toucher and Rich hosted "Mark Gemelli Christmas," where Mr. Gemelli was taken to Bernie and Phyl's in Saugus, MA and was allowed to pick out a new, free recliner. On April 8, 2022, Mr. Gemelli revealed that he witnessed part of the Government Center parking garage collapse, and was one of the first people on the scene to assist with the situation.
Jim Gray Interview: While on "Radio Row" in Atlanta prior to Super Bowl LIII, washed-up sportscaster Jim Gray joined Fred, Rich and Jon for an interview. The exchange lasted less than five minutes, with Gray giving curt, defensive answers about his friendships with Tom Brady and Oprah Winfrey. Upon being called out by Fred for not wanting to be there, Gray wished the show luck as they went to the headlines segment. While Jon read his headlines, Gray berated Fred and Rich off-air. Gray's off-air temper tantrum was featured on the show's Twitch stream.
Brookline 911: Also known as "Everyone's Angry in Brookline," Fred, Rich, and Jon listen to recordings of 911 calls from angry, entitled residents of Brookline, MA. Calls include a woman reporting children who were taking rocks from a local beach, a man who claimed a Trader Joe's employee laughed at him, and a Star Market shopper who inexplicably proclaims in a thick accent that he "didn't do anything, she was tagging the five-sector." Now one of the most famous segments on the show, Toucher and Rich held a live "Brookline 911" event on May 13, 2022, at the Wilbur Theater in Boston, featuring previously unaired phone calls.
Kyle Bailey vs. Fred Toucher: Host of the afternoon drive show on WFNZ, Kyle Bailey instigated a feud with Fred in 2022, following an incident years prior when Fred hung up on a North Carolina-based sportswriter during an interview. Fred's on-air responses to Bailey's attempts at a verbal assault resulted in Bailey calling WBZ-FM program director Rick Radzik over a dozen times to complain.

Notes

American comedy radio programs
American sports radio programs